Guide Bridge railway station serves Guide Bridge in Audenshaw, Greater Manchester, England, and is operated by Northern Trains.

History

It was built by the Sheffield, Ashton-under-Lyne and Manchester Railway on its new line from Ardwick Junction, near to the Manchester and Birmingham Railway's terminus at Store Street station, to Sheffield; it opened as Ashton and Hooley Hill on 11 November 1841 when the line opened as far as Godley Toll Bar. It was renamed Ashton in February 1842 and became Guide Bridge on 14 July 1845, when the line was extended to Sheffield.

The station had a four platform configuration originally, with a large office on the southern side. However, the southern (former slow line) platforms were decommissioned and the tracks were lifted in 1984–85; this was part of layout alterations associated with the changeover from 1500 V DC to 25 kV AC working on the Hadfield line, with demolition of the buildings following a few years later.  The area has been covered, with a section forming part of the car park, but some evidence remains of the previous two tracks. The junction at the country end of the station was also remodelled in 2011 to allow Stockport-Stalybridge Line trains to cross the junction at 30 mph (max) rather than 15 mph as previously.

With the electrification of the Woodhead Line between Manchester and Sheffield in the early 1950s, Guide Bridge, already a major centre of railway operations, increased in importance. Express trains called here, as well as EMU trains between Manchester London Road and the north Derbyshire towns of Glossop and Hadfield. There were also DMU-operated services from London Road to Macclesfield, via , which closed south of Rose Hill in January 1970; Stockport Edgeley to Stalybridge; and to Oldham, via the Oldham, Ashton & Guide Bridge Railway, which closed to passengers in 1959.

The station was also where express services, to and from Manchester Central on the London Marylebone route, changed locomotives. Drawn by a Bo-Bo or Co-Co electric locomotive from Sheffield, a steam (or in later years) diesel locomotive would take the train the final few miles to Manchester Central and vice versa. The Woodhead Line was busy with goods traffic, especially with coal traffic from South Yorkshire to Lancashire power stations. The station also accepted goods under British Railways "Passenger" freight service and had a licensed buffet.

There was a large marshalling yard about a mile east of Guide Bridge at Dewsnap. There was also a stabling point immediately to the east of Guide Bridge station, where engines could be fuelled. Guide Bridge was also where the local Retail Coal Merchants transferred coal from British Rail coal wagons, carefully weighed into one hundredweight sacks for delivery to homes around Ashton, Audenshaw and Denton. Express passenger trains via the Woodhead line ceased operation on 5 January 1970, but Dewsnap sidings and Guide Bridge stabling point were busy until the final closure of the Woodhead Line east of Hadfield on 20 July 1981. The Class 76 electric locomotives were a frequent sight here, along with Class 25, Class 40 and numerous others classes of diesels.

The former TransPennine Express operator, Arriva Trains Northern, had plans to establish Guide Bridge as a major interchange station, coupled with hopes that the Woodhead line might re-open. Such aspirations seem to have fallen by the wayside, however, since First TransPennine Express took over the franchise.

On 22 October 2006, a fire gutted the waiting room, footbridge and ticket office. The fire has subsequently been attributed to arson and caused around £1m of damage to the station, necessitating the demolition of the footbridge. This has not been rebuilt, necessitating a lengthy walk out of the station and along the adjacent main road to change platforms.

In January 2009, the previously free car parking was abolished, with a daily charge of £3 being introduced. As a result, the once busy car park  largely fell quiet. A subsequent review was taken, following complaints from neighbouring residents, with backing of local councillors over the re-distribution of cars once parked on the ample station facility to the surrounding residential streets with charging dismissed soon afterwards.

Facilities

A new single-storey ticket office was commissioned in December 2014; it was built on the former island platform (now platform 1), as part of a £1.7 million revamp of the station. Improved lighting, an extended car park with 140 spaces, CCTV cameras and cycle storage lockers were also provided.  The new facilities were opened officially by the Minister of State for Transport Baroness Kramer.

Services

The current service at Guide Bridge consists of a half-hourly Manchester Piccadilly-Hadfield EMU service, increasing to every 20 minutes during weekday peak periods, and a half-hourly DMU service between Piccadilly and Rose Hill Marple (see Northern timetables 22 and 24 for details). There is a limited service after 19:00 each evening to Rose Hill Marple, whilst the Glossop service drops to hourly after 21:00. Early morning, rush hour and late evening services start or terminate at Glossop.

On Sundays, there is a half-hourly service to Hadfield but no service on the Rose Hill Marple line.

The Stockport-Stalybridge line DMU service, which had previously been an hourly operation, was almost entirely withdrawn when TransPennine services between Manchester and Leeds were re-routed from Manchester Victoria to serve Manchester Piccadilly in 1989. There was, for a time, a 16:08 Friday only "service" from Stalybridge to Guide Bridge whilst weekend engineering work was taking place in the Stockport area (in 2004). Subsequent to this, the once-weekly parliamentary train on the route operated in the other direction (leaving Stockport at 9:22 and calling at 9:37, on Fridays only). This train was also unusual in that it arrived at Guide Bridge on the Manchester-bound platform before changing tracks after departure. Since the start of the summer 2018 timetable on 20 May, the service on this route has operated on Saturdays instead of Fridays and now has a return working, with one train to Stockport at 08.51 and a return to Stalybridge just over an hour later at 10:01. From the start of December 2019 timetable, it now departs Guide Bridge at 10:13 for Stockport and arrives back at 10:58 - it allows only 10 minutes in Stockport.

A limited number of peak hour only Northern service are routed through Guide Bridge between Manchester Piccadilly-Marsden/Huddersfield and called at the station following the May 2018 timetable change.  These no longer operate as of December 2019, as TPE now run all services between Piccadilly and Huddersfield and none of these trains stop here.

See also 
Audenshaw Junction rail crash

References

External links

 British Railways in 1960: Dunford Bridge to Manchester

Railway stations in Tameside
DfT Category E stations
Former Great Central Railway stations
Railway stations in Great Britain opened in 1841
Northern franchise railway stations
1846 establishments in England
Audenshaw